Frozen Frontier (officially Greater Rochester Area Honda Dealers Frozen Frontier presented by Labatt) was a multi-day outdoor ice hockey event in December 2013 in Rochester, New York.  An ice rink was erected in the infield of Frontier Field, a baseball stadium.

Events included:
December 13 — The 2013-14 AHL Outdoor Classic: Rochester Americans vs. Lake Erie Monsters
December 14 — RIT Tigers (women) vs. Clarkson Golden Knights (women) / RIT Tigers (men) vs. Niagara Purple Eagles (men)
December 15 — Nazareth Golden Flyers vs. Geneseo Knights / Buffalo Junior Sabres vs. St. Michael's Buzzers / Rochester Americans alumni vs. Buffalo Sabres alumni
December 21 & 22 — High school ice hockey games

References

External links

Sports in Rochester, New York
2013–14 in American ice hockey
Rochester Americans
Rochester Institute of Technology
2013 in sports in New York (state)
AHL Outdoor Classic